Christian Henry Pozer (December 26, 1835 – July 18, 1884) was a Canadian lawyer and politician.

Born in St-Georges d'Aubert Gallion (now Saint-Georges), Beauce, Lower Canada (now Quebec), the son of William Pozer and Ann Milbourne, he was called to the Lower Canada bar in 1860.

In 1863, he ran as a Liberal for the Legislative Assembly of the Province of Canada in the riding of Beauce and was defeated. He was elected in 1867 and re-elected in 1871. He resigned in 1874.

At the same time, he was elected to the House of Commons of Canada for the riding of Beauce in 1867. A Liberal he was re-elected in 1872 and 1874.

He resigned from the House of Commons when he was appointed a Senator in 1876 representing the senatorial division of Lauzon, Quebec. He died in office in 1884 and was buried in the Pozer Cemetery in St-Georges-de-Beauce.

References

External links
 
 
 

1835 births
1884 deaths
Canadian Anglicans
Canadian senators from Quebec
Liberal Party of Canada MPs
Members of the House of Commons of Canada from Quebec
Quebec Liberal Party MNAs
People from Beauce, Quebec